Berchemia racemosa, commonly known as paniculous supplejack, is a shrub in the genus Berchemia.

Forms and varieties
 Berchemia racemosa f. pilosa Hatusima
 Berchemia racemosa f. stenosperma Hatusima
 Berchemia racemosa var. luxurians Hatusima
 Berchemia racemosa var. magna Makino

References

racemosa